Claudin-6 is a protein that in humans is encoded by the CLDN6 gene. It belongs to the group of claudins. The knockout mice of mouse homolog exhibit no phenotype, indicating that claudin-6 is dispensable for normal development and homeostasis.

References

External links

Further reading